This is a list of the squads that qualified for the 2010 Champions League Twenty20. All teams had to submit a final squad of 15 on August 9, 2010.

South Australian Redbacks
Coach:  Mark Sorell

Victorian Bushrangers
Coach:  Greg Shipperd

Chennai Super Kings
Coach:  Stephen Fleming

Mumbai Indians
Coach:  Robin Singh

Royal Challengers Bangalore
Coach:  Ray Jennings

Central Stags
Coach:  Alan Hunt

Highveld Lions
Coach:  Dave Nosworthy

Warriors
Coach:  Russell Domingo

Wayamba Elevens
Coach: Manoj Abeywickrama

Guyana
Coach:  Ravindranauth Seeram

References

External links
 2010 Champions League Twenty20 squads on ESPN CricInfo

Champions League Twenty20 squads